Asura amabilis is a moth of the  family Erebidae. It is found on the Solomon Islands.

References

amabilis
Moths described in 1901
Moths of Oceania